Catalin Petrisor (born 9 August 1992) is a Romanian basketball player for Focșani of the LNB and the Romanian national team.

He participated at the EuroBasket 2017.

References

Living people
1992 births
CSM Oradea (basketball) players
Point guards
Romanian men's basketball players